Luna Guitars, commonly referred to simply as Luna, is a musical instrument company that manufactures string and percussion instruments. Its range of products include steel-string acoustic guitars, mandolins, ukuleles, cajones, kalimbas, and both acoustic and electric bass guitars. It is currently a subsidiary of Armadillo Enterprises, Inc.

History 
Luna Guitars was established in 2005 by Yvonne de Villiers, a professional stained-glass artist. Their guitars feature artwork, henna designs, and other patterns including images of a dragon and phoenix. Guitars are built with slimmer necks and lighter bodies which not only appealed to female guitarists but have caught the attention of players from all backgrounds and skill levels. 

Over the years, Luna added electric guitars, ukuleles and a variety of bluegrass instruments. Designs include laser-etched tattoo designs, high tide wave inlays made of abalone, and landscapes made from tropical woods. 

In 2017, Luna introduced the percussion line featuring cajons with an adjustable snare. Luna cajons focused on enhancing three key elements of the performance: visual aesthetics, functionality, and comfort. Like the fretted instruments, the percussion line saw success and expanded, including additional models and instruments. In 2022, three Kalimbas were introduced to the line as a more relaxing instrument that serves different purposes, from mental health benefits to music. 

Today, the Luna brand is known as a lifestyle brand, relatable to all players and skill levels, creating quality instruments at an affordable price. There are three main branches that complete the Luna brand: Luna Guitars, Luna Ukes, Luna Percussion, with Luna Guitars being the main and dominate logo. From artists such as Rick Springfield and The Warren Brothers to music departments in schools and charity organizations, there is something unique for everyone to play. Luna players are beginners as well as seasoned singer-songwriters and musicians.

References

External links
 

Guitar manufacturing companies of the United States
Ukulele makers
Manufacturing companies established in 2005
2005 establishments in Florida
American companies established in 2005
Companies based in Tampa, Florida